Richard Allan "Ricky" Kasso Jr. (March 29, 1967 – July 7, 1984), also known as The Acid King, was an American killer who murdered his 17-year-old friend Gary Lauwers in Northport, New York on June 19, 1984. Two other teens, Jimmy Troiano and Albert Quinones, were present at the murder, which took place in the Aztakea Woods of Northport while all four were under the influence of what they believed to be mescaline, but was most likely LSD.

The murder became sensational news in New York City and across the nation due to the alleged torture of Lauwers and supposed occult aspects of the murder. The murder took place during a period known as the "Satanic panic" when there was much public concern over the effects of Satanic and occult content in heavy metal music and in role-playing games. Kasso was wearing an AC/DC T-shirt at the time of his arrest and was a fan of groups such as Black Sabbath, Judas Priest and Ozzy Osbourne.

Biographical background
Kasso was the son of a local high school history teacher and football coach at affluent Cold Spring Harbor High School. Kasso was often thrown out of his home as a young teen and lived on the streets of suburban Northport, New York, usually sleeping in the local woods, or in the cars, garages, backyards and houses of friends. He often took drugs, mainly marijuana, hashish, LSD, PCP, and purple "microdots" of what he believed to be mescaline, but was most likely low-grade LSD. He tended to consume all of his drugs, but had on occasion dealt drugs in Northport as well.

Kasso was acquainted with the members of a loosely organized group of friends who sold marijuana and referred to themselves as the "Knights of the Black Circle". After Kasso's murder of Lauwers, several newspapers and television journalists incorrectly reported the Knights as being a "satanic cult." Kasso allegedly participated in occult ceremonies, mostly in Northport, and celebrated Walpurgis Night at the infamous Amityville Horror house in 1984. Kasso also expressed to friends his interest in Anton LaVey's book The Satanic Bible. On at least one occasion, Ricky's parents admitted him to the South Oaks Psychiatric Hospital (formerly known as the Amityville Asylum) in Amityville, New York for drug rehabilitation and psychiatric care.

In the year prior to the murder, Kasso had been arrested for digging into a colonial-era grave inside a local cemetery. Less than a month after his arrest for this crime, Ricky contracted pneumonia and was treated at Long Island Jewish Hospital. During his hospital stay, his parents tried to convince the doctors to commit him for involuntary psychiatric care. However, the conclusion of the psychiatrists was that Kasso exhibited antisocial behavior but was neither psychotic nor a violent danger, and Kasso was released upon recovering from his bout with pneumonia.

Murder of Gary Lauwers
The conflict between Kasso and Lauwers had started some time earlier when Lauwers stole 10 bags of PCP from Kasso's jacket, after he had passed out at a party. Kasso confronted him soon after the incident, prompting Lauwers to immediately return five of the ten bags of PCP. Lauwers also promised to repay Kasso $50 for the five bags of PCP that had been used. Kasso reportedly beat Lauwers on four occasions. On the night of the murder, Kasso visited the small gazebo in the new Cow Harbor park and borrowed a radio from a friend. He then invited Lauwers to get high with him, Troiano and Quinones. The group walked to Aztakea Woods, set up camp and ingested several doses, or "hits", of what they believed to be mescaline. The drugs they ingested were tablets called "purple microdots", and while they were erroneously referred to as mescaline on the street, they were likely LSD. The teens also smoked several bags of PCP before attempting to start a small fire, but all of the available firewood was too wet and would not ignite. Lauwers used his socks, as well as the sleeves from his denim jacket, as kindling to start the fire.

At some point during the night, the situation escalated into violence. Kasso scuffled with Lauwers, bit him on the neck and stabbed him in the chest. Kasso continued his assault on Lauwers, and Quinones later claimed that Troiano helped Kasso and held Lauwers during the attack. During subsequent testimony he provided under immunity, Quinones later claimed that Troiano did not assist Kasso. Lauwers was stabbed somewhere between 17 and 36 times and his eyeballs were possibly sliced out during the stabbing. During the attack, Kasso allegedly commanded Lauwers to "Say you love Satan", and Lauwers is said to have instead replied "I love my mother," before finally giving in to Kasso's demands. After the attack, Kasso and Troiano covered Lauwers' body with leaves and small branches and left it in the woods.

The date of the murder was initially misreported by the police and press as June 16, 1984. In 2018, it was revealed that the murder had actually taken place three days later on June 19.

Aftermath and death
In the aftermath, Kasso bragged about the murder to friends. Kasso claimed Satan manifested in the form of a black crow after killing Lauwers, and that the crow had cawed, something he interpreted as Satan's approval of the murder. Kasso even brought several disbelieving teens to view Lauwers' body before he and Troiano returned to the woods to bury the decomposing remains in a shallow grave. However, it wasn't until two weeks went by, on July 1, that the murder was reported to the police via an anonymous tip. On July 4, 1984, police used dogs to search Aztakea Woods and recovered the decomposing and mutilated body of Gary Lauwers. Kasso and Troiano were arrested the next day. On July 7, Kasso died of suicide by hanging himself in his jail cell.

Jimmy Troiano signed two confessions that he later recanted. Quinones gave witness account that Troiano helped Kasso during the murder, but later denied this during his testimony at Troiano's trial. Due to Quinones' drugged state at the time of the killing, his testimony was brought into question and Troiano was acquitted of second-degree murder in a trial by jury in April 1985.

Books, films, and songs inspired by Kasso 
Books
 Say You Love Satan (published October 1, 1987 by Dell Books) by David St. Clair, a heavily fictionalized telling of the events that is no longer in print. For his book, St. Clair plagiarized several portions of "Kids in the Dark", an article by David Breskin for Rolling Stone, and Breskin considered legal action. Literary critic and journalist Phil Jenkins of the Ottawa Citizen called it "trash", "lowbrow", and "junk" in his review.
 The Acid King (published October 16, 2018 by Simon & Schuster) by Jesse P. Pollack, a nonfiction account of Kasso's life and his murder of Lauwers, containing interviews with his friends, family, and the investigators who worked the case.

Documentaries
 The Devil Worshippers (1985, TV), episode of ABC news program 20/20, featuring the Lauwers murder.
 Devil Worship: Exposing Satan's Underground (1988, TV), prime-time episode of Geraldo narrated by Geraldo Rivera, also featuring the Lauwers murder.
 Satan in the Suburbs (2000, TV), directed by Scott Hillier
 Killer Kids (2012, TV), episode "Occult Killers", directed by Jean Leclerc for The Biography Channel, featuring the Lauwers murder.
 The Acid King (2019), written and directed by Jesse P. Pollack and Dan Jones, released in November 2021.

Films
 Where Evil Dwells (1985), directed by Tommy Turner and David Wojnarowicz. Kasso is portrayed by Scott Werner.
 My Sweet Satan (1994), directed by Jim Van Bebber. He plays "Ricky Kasslin", a character based on Kasso.
 Black Circle Boys (1997), directed by Matthew Carnahan. It was inspired by the events in Northport. "Shane Carver", the character very loosely based on Kasso, is played by Eric Mabius. 
 Ricky 6 (2000), also known as Ricky Six, Ricky 666 and Say You Love Satan, directed by Peter Filardi. "Ricky Cowen", the character based on Kasso, is portrayed by Vincent Kartheiser. Winner of the Audience Prize at the Fantasia Film Festival, it has never been officially released.
 Under Surveillance, aka Dark Chamber (2006), directed by Dave Campfield. The film was inspired by the Lauwers murder and was shot on location in Northport.

Albums and songs
 "Sudden Impact!" (1985, This Is Big Audio Dynamite) by Big Audio Dynamite
 "Satan Is Boring" (1985, Bad Moon Rising) by Sonic Youth
 "0-0 (Where Evil Dwells)" (1987, Dirtdish)  by Wiseblood. Covered by Fear Factory on their 1998 album Obsolete.
 "Bad Party" (1988, Beelzebubba) by the Dead Milkmen
 "Cryin' Shame" (1989, Wake Me When It's Over) by Faster Pussycat
 "The Usurper" (1993, The Passing) by Betrayal
 "Psychedelic Sacrifice" (1993, Burn, Baby, Burn!) by the Electric Hellfire Club
 "The Midway" (1994, Acid King) by Acid King
 "One Ninety-six" (1995, Zoroaster) by Acid King
 "Teen Dusthead" (1997, Down With The Crown) by Acid King
 "Phase II" (1997, Down With The Crown) by Acid King
 "Silent Circle" (1999, Busse Woods) by Acid King
 "Electric Machine" (1999, Busse Woods) by Acid King
 "True Believer" (1999. The Gathering) by Testament
 "Teenage Dirtbag" (2000, Wheatus) by Wheatus 
 "Catacomb Kids" (2007, None Shall Pass) by Aesop Rock
 "From Listening to Lightning" (2009, The Lightning EP) by Wheatus
 "Cat's Cradle" (2010, TV, Death And The Devil) by Nü Sensae
 "Severed Heads of State" (2012, The Grimy Awards) by Ill Bill
 "Ricky Kasso" (2013, Howie Made Me Do It 3) by Ill Bill
 Time to Die (2014) by Electric Wizard
 "Black Circle (S.Y.L.S.)" (2015, Where Evil Dwells) by Ranger
 "Too Many Devils And Drugs" (2016, Longing For Infection) by Fistula
 "Acid King" (2018, Malibu Ken) by Malibu Ken (Aesop Rock and Tobacco)

Notes

Further reading 
In Rolling Stone magazine:
 "Kids in the Dark" by David Breskin (November 22, 1984)
 "Kids in the Dark" by David Breskin (June 11, 1992)

In Newsday (Long Island, New York):
 "A Shared Secret: Murder in Northport" by Thomas Maier and Rex Smith (August 12, 1984)
 "The Murder They'd Rather Forget" by Joshua Quittner (April 16, 1987)
 "The Theater of Suburban Rage" by Joseph C. Koenenn (April 16, 1987)
 "Upstate Suspect Has LI Past" by Monte R. Young (January 16, 1993)

In the Toronto Sun:
 "The Acid King" by Max Haines (July 17, 1988)

In the Philadelphia Daily News (Pennsylvania):
 "Satanic Slaying Rocks a Village" by Bill Reinecke (July 11, 1984)

Chronology of the trial in the New York Times (available online)
 "Youth Found Hanged in L.I. Cell After His Arrest in Ritual Killing" by Robert D. Mcfadden (July 8, 1984)
 "Teenager Indicted on L.I. in Ritual Slaying of Youth" by Michael Norman (July 12, 1984)
 "'Satanic Ritual' Is Now Ruled Out in June Slaying of Youth in L.I. Woods" by Lindsey Gruson (December 27, 1984)
 "Jury Selection Begins in Stabbing Death of Teenager in Northport" by Lindsey Gruson (March 27, 1985)
 "L.I. Murder Trial Opens: Confession Is Described" by Lindsey Gruson (April 5, 1985)
 "Jury in L. I. Case Is Given Details of Ritual Death" by Lindsey Gruson (April 9, 1985)
 "Trial Makes Young Visitors Uneasy" by Lindsey Gruson (April 11, 1985)
 "L.I. Youth Called Lucid on Stabbing" (April 17, 1985)
 "Defense Lawyer in L.I. Trial Loves a Good Murder Case" by Lindsey Gruson (April 18, 1985)
 "Story of Murder May Be Illusion, Expert Testifies" by Lindsey Gruson (April 19, 1985)
 "Closing Arguments Made in Trial of Youth Accused in Drug-Induced Slaying on L.I." by Lindsey Gruson (April 23, 1985)
 "Jury in L.I. Slaying Meets for 7 Hours" (April 25, 1985)
 "L.I. Jury Acquits Defendant in Killing of Youth in Woods" (April 26, 1985)

External links 
"Kids In The Dark" by David Breskin

1967 births
1984 suicides
American murderers of children
American people who died in prison custody
American Satanists
Crimes involving Satanism or the occult
People from Northport, New York
People who committed suicide in prison custody
Prisoners who died in New York (state) detention
Suicides by hanging in New York (state)